One Big Happy Family is an American reality television series featuring the Coles family, an African-American family of four who reside in Indian Trail, North Carolina. The series premiered on TLC on December 29, 2009. The show deals with their family life and with their efforts to lose weight, (each family member, at the initial episode, weighed in excess of 330 pounds).

Cast
The numbers in parentheses are the age and weight of each family member when the first episode aired.
 Tameka Coles - (36 years old, 380 lbs) Mother of Amber and Shayne and wife of Norris. She works two jobs that leave her little time to get any exercise. She tells the viewers that she began to gain weight after giving birth to Amber and Shayne.
 Norris Coles - (41 years old, 340 lbs) Father of Amber and Shayne and husband of Tameka. He is mainly a stay-at-home parent, though he buys and sells garage sales items for profit.
 Amber Coles -  (17 years old, 348 lbs) Amber is the older of the two children.  She is a member of the flag corps at her high school.
 Shayne Coles - (14 years old, 336 lbs) Shayne is the younger of the two children.

Episodes

Series overview

Season 1 (2009–10)

Season 2 (2010)

References

2009 American television series debuts
2000s American reality television series
2010 American television series endings
2010s American reality television series
TLC (TV network) original programming
African-American reality television series
Television shows set in North Carolina
Television series about families
Television series by Banijay